The Mercedes-Benz C216 is the last generation for the grand tourer with name Mercedes-Benz CL-Class. It replaced the C215 platform. In 2014 it was replaced by the C217 S-Class Coupe.

Initial release (2006–)

Like its predecessors, the C216 has no B-pillar interrupting the sleek curve of the side windows. The C216 body was designed by Gorden Wagener and Peter Pfeiffer.

The chassis is based on the W221 S-Class. The two-door coupé weighs , heavier than the equivalent S saloon, and rides on a full-size 116.3-inch wheelbase (albeit 8.2 inches less than the long wheelbase S-Class, which is the only S-Class sold in the U.S.). Despite its large size, rear seat legroom is limited in keeping in the tradition of 2+2 luxury coupés, though CL has more rear passenger space than its rivals. The CL's boot is as large as that of the Audi A8 flagship saloon.

The vehicle was unveiled in the 2006 Paris Motor Show, followed by the 28th Bangkok International Motor Show (in right-handed drive configuration).

The vehicle went on sale in Early-July 2006 in Europe (UK arrival spring 2007). Early models included CL 500 with 7G-TRONIC transmission, CL 600 with five-speed automatic transmission.

CL 65 AMG, "40th Anniversary" limited-edition (2006–)

The "40th Anniversary" edition CL 65 AMG is a limited (40 units) version of the CL 65 AMG commemorating the 40th anniversary of AMG, designed by the specialists of the AMG PERFORMANCE STUDIO. It included exclusive AMG Alubeam (Liquid Metal) body paint (from Vision GST and SL 400 CDI), AMG two-bar front grille, large under-bumper air intakes, air outlets on the front fenders and round fog lights, rear apron with a black air diffuser insert and twin V12-design tailpipes, two-tone EXCLUSIVE PASSION Nappa leather seats with new AMG V12 diamond pattern stitching, embossed V12 logos in the front head restraints, color-coordinated Alcantara roof lining, nappa leather upholstery at airbag unit of the AMG ergonomic sports steering wheel, carbon fiber interior trim, "40th Anniversary" lettering on the center console and a "One Out of 40" badge on the handrest of the COMAND controller.

The 2008 model year Mercedes-Benz CL 65 AMG was unveiled in the 2007 New York International Auto Show.

CL 500 model "Trademark Centenary" (2009–)
It is a version of the 2009 model year CL 500 and CL 500 4MATIC commemorating the 100th birthday of the Mercedes three-pointed star and the Benz emblem, when on 24 June 1909 Daimler-Motoren-Gesellschaft officially registered the design of the Mercedes star, and on 6 August Benz & Cie. registered the letters "Benz", enclosed by a laurel wreath, as a trademark with the Imperial Patent Office. Changes include historic trademarks dating from 1909 in gilded plate brass, which are inset into the centre console; designo metallic graphite body colour, AMG Sports package, exclusive high-sheen 20-inch 5 twin-spoke AMG light-alloy wheels in titanium grey, 255/35 R 20 front and 275/35 R 20 rear tyres, partly hand-stitched designo aniline leather with contrasting seams in a light sand colour, wood/leather steering wheel, interior trim in shining black piano lacquer, anthracite Alcantara roof lining and black floor mats with AMG lettering and sand-coloured edging.

The vehicle went on sale on 26 June 2009.

CL 550 4MATIC "100 Years of Mercedes-Benz Edition" (2009–)
It is a limited version of the 2010 model year CL 550 4MATIC based on the CL 500 4MATIC model "Trademark Centenary", with 255/35 R 20 tires, Sahara Beige leather interior upholstery, an SD card slot in the center console, a USB interface in the glove compartment, a universal Media Interface for connecting mobile audio devices and all components of the Premium 2 package.

The US model went on sale in summer of 2009.

Engines

BlueEFFICIENCY models include ECO start/stop function.

Transmissions

Performance

Equipment
AMG bodystyling (includes front bumper with enlarged air intakes, chrome-ringed circular fog lamps, two slanted struts and a smooth transition to the prominent wheel arches, AMG side skirts, AMG rear apron, rear bumper with its black insert and chrome trim strip flanked by tailpipes on either side), AMG light-alloy wheels (includes 19-inch five-spoke wheels (8.5/9.5-wide) with embossed AMG lettering, high-sheen rim flange and spokes, 255/40 (front) and 275/40 (rear) tyres) went on sale in September 2006, for CL 500 and CL 600.

New features

The Pre-Safe Brake world premiere on the CL-Class C216  with the first partial autonomous braking (40%, or up to 0.4g deceleration) if the driver does not react to the BAS Plus warnings and the system detects a severe danger of an accident. If the driver then immediately applied the brakes, the maximum braking force was available and – depending on the situation – the accident could be averted at the last moment. If an accident was unavoidable, the PRE-SAFE brakes reduced the impact severity and, in turn, the risk of injury to the vehicle occupants.

The Distronic Plus adaptive cruise control is able to bring the car to a complete stop, and accelerate again to the pre-set speed, to keep a pre-set distance away from the car ahead of it. Also introduced active infrared Night View Assist enables drivers to view the conditions in front of the car despite the dark surroundings. Intelligent Light System headlights with five light modes, including active light function.

In 2007 it added the first Mercedes-Benz Blind Spot Assist system (includes six short-range radar sensors in the front and rear bumpers). This was available as option for CL-Class.

AMG Sports package for 2009 CL-Class (including a front apron with large air intakes, rear apron with a black insert and integrated rectangular tailpipe trim in polished stainless steel, AMG side sill panels, 19-inch AMG light-alloy wheels in with a five-spoke design and wide-base 255/40 (front) and 275/40 (rear) tyres (optional 20-inch AMG light-alloy wheels in a twin-spoke design with 255/35 and 275/35 tyres), perforated brake discs and silver-painted brake callipers with Mercedes-Benz lettering (V8/V12 engine models), wood trim and wood/leather steering wheel in black ash, velour floor mats with AMG lettering, sports pedals in brushed stainless steel with rubber studs) was available for CL 500 and CL 500 4MATIC beginning in June 2009.

From 2009, Mercedes-Benz has only been offering the CL 550 in 4Matic in US/Canada, as a strategy to increase sales in snowy regions. While all the systems are the same, the suspension has been degraded from ABC to Airmatic, as 4Matic is not compatible with ABC. The CL 600 and CL 65 AMG remained the same rear-wheel drive variants.

Marketing
As part of Mercedes-Benz CL-Class launch, Mercedes-Benz Accessories GMBH released accessories for the CL-Class vehicles, including leather wallet and business card case in black nappa based on the trim in the CL's cockpit, ash timber pens and umbrella handle based on the wood trim found in the car's cockpit, driving gloves and instrumentation-inspired wristwatch, keyring and money clip with the MB logo, and a diecast model car made by AUTOart. The accessories were available beginning in September 2006.

2010 facelift

The vehicle was unveiled in the 2010 Goodwood Festival of Speed, followed by the 2010 Paris Motor Show.

Changes include:
exterior and interior, new grille, bi-xenon headlights with LED technology, LED fog lamps, revised fenders and hood, and new exhaust pipes, addition of a new interior wood trim
Adaptive Highbeam Assist
Attention Assist
Active Blind Spot Assist world premiere
Active Lane Keeping Assist world premiere
2011: first series production car with night vision-guided pedestrian spotlighting: Night View Assist Plus with Spotlight Function can flash at any pedestrians it detects in order to warn both the driver and the pedestrians. The flashing light is directed in such a way that vehicles in front and oncoming traffic are not dazzled.
PRE-SAFE Brake upgrade now activates maximum braking pressure around 0.6 seconds before what it recognises as an unavoidable collision.
Direct-Steer
Active Body Control (ABC) with crosswind stabilisation 
Torque Vectoring Brake
COMAND with SPLITVIEW dual view display.
COMAND APS navigation system replaces DVD with 40 gigabyte hard-disk drive map.

Equipment 
Active Body Control suspension (standard, only on rear-wheel drive, for US market only on CL 600 and AMG)
AIRMATIC air suspension with continuously Adaptive Damping System Plus (standard on US market CL 550 4MATIC, not for CL 600 and AMG)
Nine airbags as standard
ESP Dynamic Cornering Assist
Traffic Sign Assist with Speed Limit Assist 
ATTENTION ASSIST (as standard)
ADAPTIVE BRAKE (as standard)
DISTRONIC PLUS 
Brake Assist system BAS PLUS 
NECK-PRO crash-responsive head restraints
PRE-SAFE, PRE-SAFE Brake
Active bonnet
Active Lane Keeping Assist
Bi-Xenon headlamps with Intelligent Light System and Adaptive Highbeam Assist
Night View Assist PLUS
Active Parking Assist
Active Blind Spot Assist
Crosswind Assist
Torque Vectoring Brake
Backup camera
Electric parking brake with emergency braking function
Direct-Steer Electromechanical steering with Steer Assist electromechanical steering power assistance

Early models include CL 500 BlueEFFICIENCY, CL 500 4MATIC BlueEFFICIENCY, CL 600.

US models arrived at Mercedes-Benz dealerships in November 2010 as 2011 model year vehicles. Early models include CL 550 4MATIC, CL 63 AMG.

CL 63 AMG (2010-2014)

Other AMG Performance Studio options include:
AMG double-spoke forged wheels in titanium grey with a mirror finish with 255/35 R 20 (front) and 275/30 R 20 (rear) tyres
AMG double-spoke forged wheels, in black with a mirror finish with 255/35 R 20 (front) and 275/35 R 20 (rear) tyres
AMG Exterior Carbon package
AMG performance steering wheel in leather/Alcantara
AMG carbon-fibre trim elements

Other options include designo products (including exclusive paint finishes, leather upholstery, trim elements and steering wheels), designo Selection.

The vehicle went on sale in September 2010.

US model arrived at Mercedes-Benz dealerships in November 2010 as 2011 model year vehicle.

CL 65 AMG (2010-2014)

AMG Performance Studio options include:
AMG double-spoke forged wheels in black with a mirror finish and 255/35 R 20 (front) and 275/35 R 20 (rear) tyres
AMG Exterior Carbon package
AMG performance steering wheel in leather/Alcantara
AMG carbon-fibre interior trim elements

Other options include designo products (including exclusive paint finishes, leather upholstery, trim elements and steering wheels), designo Selection.

The vehicle went on sale for 191,450 euros (excl. VAT)/227,825 euros (incl. 19% VAT).

US models arrived at Mercedes-Benz dealerships in November 2010 as 2011 model year vehicle.

CL "Grand Edition" (2012-2014)
It is a version of the CL 500 BlueEFFICIENCY, CL 500 4MATIC BlueEFFICIENCY and CL 600 commemorating 60 years of the S-Class Coupé. Changes include a choice of 3 designo body colours (platinum black metallic, mocha black metallic and matt magno cashmere white), AMG Sports package 20-inch light-alloy wheels in a choice of five-spoke or filigree 10-spoke designs, a "Grand Edition" badge, a choice interior 3 aniline leather upholstery colours (designo aniline leather armagnac, designo aniline leather deep black, designo aniline leather porcelain), full range of CL trim finishes (including black ash and high-gloss burr walnut), Active Body Control (ABC) with crosswind stabilisation, drowsiness detection system ATTENTION ASSIST, PRE-SAFE automatic emergency braking, optional Active Blind Spot Assist, Active Lane Keeping Assist, and Adaptive Highbeam Assist systems.

The vehicle was unveiled in the 2012 Geneva Motor Show.

Japan models went on sale in 2012-09-19, which included only CL 550 4MATIC BlueEFFICIENCY Grand Edition, with designo mocha black (17 units) or designo magno cashmere white (matte) (3 units) body colour, designo porcelain (leather) interior, black ash wood interior trim, AMG styling package (front spoiler, side and rear skirt), exclusive design 20-inch 5-spoke aluminium wheels, 'Grand Edition' side emblem and designo floor mats.

Engines

BlueEFFICIENCY models include ECO start/stop function.

The CL 500 was sold as CL 550 in the US and Japan.

Transmissions

AMG SPEEDSHIFT MCT 7-speed sports transmission includes Controlled Efficiency ("C") drive mode, Controlled Efficiency stop/start function, "S" (Sport) mode with higher engine speed level in each gear, manual shift mode "M" with 100ms gearshifts and no automatic downshifts, electronic transmission control unit with its integrated 80 MHz processor. The electronic key for selection of the three driving models is located to the left of the COMAND controller.

Performance

Production
2011 and 2012 model years of the CL 550 4MATIC and CL 63 AMG were recalled for cracked fuel filter flange leading to fire if an external ignition source is present. The recall campaign was expected to begin in January 2013.

The CL-Class was replaced by the S-Class Coupé. Production ended in December 2013.

References

External links 
Mercedes CL C216 site
Press kit:
Press Kit: The new Mercedes-Benz CL-Class
Press Kit: The new Mercedes-Benz CL-Class
Press Kit: The great Mercedes-Benz Coupés
The new generation Mercedes-Benz CL-Class: The epitome of luxury coupés
Mercedes-Benz CL 63 AMG / CL 65 AMG
Mercedes Benz NTG3 Navigation

W216
W216
All-wheel-drive vehicles
Cars introduced in 2006
Rear-wheel-drive vehicles
Full-size vehicles
Flagship vehicles
Luxury vehicles
Coupés
2010s cars